Jorge Mañach y Robato (February 14, 1898, Sagua La Grande, Cuba – June 25, 1961, San Juan, Puerto Rico) was a Cuban writer and attorney, considered among the most distinguished of his time.

Education
His studies of José Martí, the 'Apostle of Cuban Independence', are estimated to be one of the best political and literal interpretations.

Mañach was educated in Cuba, Spain, the United States and France. He graduated from Harvard University in 1920, with a B.A. in Philosophy. From there he continued his higher education studies at the Université du Droit et de la Santé de Lille in Paris. And then at the University of Havana in Cuba.

Career
Mañach was one of the founders of the avant-garde magazine Revista de Avance which was launched in Havana in 1927. In the 1930s, he taught at Columbia University in New York City.

He was a participant of the revolution of 1933, and of the fights against Cuban Dictator Fulgencio Batista.

He briefly was Foreign Minister of Cuba in 1944.

Personal life
Because of his criticism of the Fidel Castro government he was forced to go into exile in 1960. He died in Puerto Rico in 1961.

He was married to Margot Baños and they had one son, Dr. Jorge Mañach-Baños.

His first cousin, Edelmira Sampedro y Robato, married the heir to the Spanish throne.

Primary Works
Belén el Aschanti, 1924.
La crisis de la alta cultura en Cuba, 1925.
Estampas de San Cristóbal, 1926.
"Goya," 1928.
"Indagación del choteo," 1928.
Tiempo muerto, 1928.
Martí, el apóstol, 1933.
Pasado vigente, 1939.
Historia y estilo, 1944.
Examen del quijotismo, 1950.
Para una filosofía de la vida y otros, 1951.
El sentido trágico de la Numancia, 1959.
Visitas españolas; lugares, personas, 1959.

References

  (Spanish)
 Anuario Social de la Habana 1939; Luz-Hilo, S.A.
 Directorio Social de la Habana 1948; P. Fernandez y Cía, S. en C.
 Libro de Oro de la Sociedad Habanera 1949; Editorial Lex
 Libro de Oro de la Sociedad Habanera 1950; Editorial Lex
 Registro Social de la Habana 1958; Molina y Cía, S.A.

Cuban non-fiction writers
Foreign ministers of Cuba
1898 births
1961 deaths
People from Sagua la Grande
Harvard University alumni
Columbia University faculty
Cuban emigrants to Puerto Rico
Cuban male writers
1940s in Cuba
20th-century Cuban lawyers
20th-century Cuban politicians
20th-century Cuban writers
20th-century male writers
20th-century non-fiction writers
Male non-fiction writers